Rarieda Constituency is an electoral constituency in Kenya. It is one of six constituencies in Siaya County, and one of two constituencies in the former Bondo District. The entire constituency is located within the now defunct Bondo County Council.

Members of Parliament

Wards

References

External links 
 

Constituencies in Nyanza Province
Constituencies in Siaya County